Dick Fitzgerald (14 March 1889 – 12 January 1957) was an Australian rules footballer who played with South Melbourne in the Victorian Football League (VFL).

Fitzgerald was recruited from the Lake Rovers Football Club in the Ovens and Murray Football League.

Notes

External links 

1889 births
1957 deaths
Australian rules footballers from Victoria (Australia)
Sydney Swans players
Wangaratta Football Club players
Albury Football Club players